Birte Weigang (born 31 January 1968 in Leipzig) is a former butterfly and backstroke swimmer from East Germany, who won three medals at the 1988 Summer Olympics in Seoul, South Korea. The twenty-year-old triumphed with the DDR women's relay team in the 4×100 m medley together with her teammates Kristin Otto, Silke Hörner and Katrin Meissner, and finished second in both the 100 m and the 200 m butterfly. She won a gold medal in 1987 at the European Championships, in the women's 4×100 m medley.

She is a daughter of the legendary Horst Weigang, once a footballer of the year for East Germany. She started her career in SC Turbine Erfurt. Weigang celebrated her biggest success in 1985, when at the age of 17 she became a European backstroke champion. Later she concentrated on butterfly style and won a silver medal at the World Championships in 1986, which were held in Madrid.

After Weigang gave up her swimming career, she became a coach.

References
 databaseOlympics

1968 births
Living people
German female backstroke swimmers
German female butterfly swimmers
Olympic swimmers of East Germany
Swimmers at the 1988 Summer Olympics
Olympic gold medalists for East Germany
Olympic silver medalists for East Germany
Swimmers from Leipzig
Place of birth missing (living people)
World Aquatics Championships medalists in swimming
European Aquatics Championships medalists in swimming
Medalists at the 1988 Summer Olympics
Olympic silver medalists in swimming
Olympic gold medalists in swimming
Sportspeople from Leipzig